Lepetodrilus galriftensis  is a species of small, deep-sea sea snail, a hydrothermal vent limpet, a marine gastropod mollusk in the family Lepetodrilidae.

Description

Distribution
This species occurs in hydrothermal vents and seeps of the Galápagos Rift, East Pacific

References

 Warén, A. & Bouchet, P. (2001) Gastropoda and Monoplacophora from hydrothermal vents and seeps; new taxa and records. The Veliger, 44, 116–231

Lepetodrilidae
Gastropods described in 1988